Armu may refer to:
 Armu, Iran (disambiguation), various places
 Armu River, in Russia